The Chanchamayo River (possibly from Quechua chanchay to walk and leap about, to walk quickly and confused, chancha chancha to walk quickly and irregularly, shancha a kind of bird, mayu river,) is a river in the Junín Region in Peru. It originates in the Huaytapallana mountain range where it is named Tulumayu. Chanchamayo flows along the town La Merced which is also called Chanchamayo. After joining Paucartambo River it is called Perené River.

References

Rivers of Peru
Rivers of Junín Region